Godzilla: Original Motion Picture Soundtrack is the soundtrack to the 2014 American monster film Godzilla, which is a reboot of Toho's Godzilla franchise and also being the 30th film in that franchise. It is also the first film in Legendary's MonsterVerse and the second Godzilla film to be completely produced by a Hollywood studio. The musical score is composed and conducted by Alexandre Desplat, being the first film composer to work on the MonsterVerse franchise. The film score was released digitally by WaterTower Music on May 13, 2014, and a separate vinyl album was launched on June 17.

Development 
Desplat had not composed previously for a monster film, having worked on movies such as The Curious Case of Benjamin Button (2008), The King's Speech (2010) and the final two Harry Potter films. He accepted the contract after being impressed with Edwards' film Monsters. He further describes the soundtrack for Godzilla as "non-stop fortissimo, with lots of brass, Japanese drums, and electric violin." Desplat described that "discovering and sustaining an emotional center against a backdrop of burning buildings, dazzling explosions and monsters" as one of his biggest challenges and to sustain this, he kept the score "organic" utilizing the various colors of an orchestra to match the nuances of the film’s ensemble cast and "emphasize these characters’ broken souls".

Track listing 

 Songs featured in the film and not included in the soundtrack

Future 
For the sequels in MonsterVerse, Godzilla: King of the Monsters (2019) and Godzilla vs. Kong (2021), Bear McCreary and Tom Holkenborg respectively composed the film scores for the counterparts. While McCreary used samples from Desplat's score in Godzilla, and had also incorporated Akira Ifukube's Godzilla themes, Holkenborg produced a new themes for Godzilla vs. Kong, disregarding Ifukube's and Desplat's themes.

Notes

References

Sources

External links 
 

2014 soundtrack albums
Alexandre Desplat soundtracks
Film scores
MonsterVerse soundtracks
WaterTower Music soundtracks
2010s film soundtrack albums